MV Piano Land is a cruise ship in service for Astro Ocean, a newly-formed Chinese cruise line. She originally entered service in April 1995 as Oriana for P&O Cruises, and was named by Queen Elizabeth II. She was built by Meyer Werft at their shipyard in Papenburg, Germany, and measures 69,153 gross tons. As Oriana, she held the Golden Cockerel trophy in recognition of being the fastest ship in the P&O Cruises fleet from 1997, when she succeeded her fleetmate Canberra, to her departure in 2019.

Overview
When she was built in 1995, Oriana was the first new ship commissioned for P&O Cruises, and the first to be designed specifically for the British cruise market. At 69,153 gross tons, she was one of the largest cruise ships in the world. She was also designed in the style of an ocean liner to facilitate long distance voyages and world cruises. She was the second ship to carry the name Oriana, and was named in tribute to the first Oriana, which served for Orient Line and P&O from 1960 to 1986. After a lengthy campaign, P&O Cruises were permitted to allocate the new Oriana the call sign 'GVSN', which was the same call sign as the first Oriana.

From 1995 when she was built, until 2000, Oriana was owned by P&O. In 2000 P&O de-merged its cruise ship operations, with ownership of Oriana transferring to the new company, P&O Princess Cruises. In 2003 P&O Princess merged with Carnival Corporation to form Carnival Corporation & plc. Despite these changes of ownership, Oriana was operated by P&O Cruises throughout.

In 2006 she was re-registered to Bermuda so that weddings could be conducted on board, and as a result, her call sign was changed to ZCDU9. In November 2011, Oriana became a ship exclusively for adults.

In August 2019, Oriana was sold to the newly-formed Chinese cruise line Astro Ocean and renamed Piano Land.

General characteristics

Design and construction
P&O wanted the new Oriana to be built in the United Kingdom, but there were no longer British shipyards capable of completing such an order, so P&O Cruises  looked overseas.

Two of the three main designers, Sweden’s Robert Tillberg and British designer John McNeece, spent a considerable amount of time on board SS Canberra investigating the needs of British passengers, so as to include as many of Canberras features as possible into Orianas design. Oriana's single funnel is designed to resemble Canberras twin funnels. She has a single deck of balconies reserved for suites, mini suites and staterooms to cater for the growing desire for balconies on board.

John McNeece and his London-based team of designers were engaged by P&O to bring the British look to the high-revenue generating interiors of the ship, such as Anderson's, Lord's Tavern, the Knightsbridge Shops, the Emporium, Harlequins, the Casino, the Photo Gallery, the Pacific Lounge, and related public spaces, as well as on-board information graphics.

Service history

1995–2019: Oriana

When she entered service Oriana was one of the largest cruise ships in the world, and the largest ship built in Germany since 1914. Since then tonnages have increased as economies of scale make larger ships more profitable to operate. Nowadays most new cruise ships have a tonnage of around 100,000 GT. Annually undertaking world cruises with fleetmate Aurora, she normally operated cruises within the Mediterranean, the Canaries, Madeira and the Baltic seas.

In December 2006 Oriana underwent a £12 million refit in Bremerhaven, Germany. Coinciding with the refit she was re-registered from Britain to Bermuda so that weddings could be held at sea. Oriana was also home to 'Oriana Rhodes', a restaurant designed by the celebrity chef Gary Rhodes in the former Curzon Room. This was later replaced by 'Sindhu' by chef Atul Kochhar, which remained in place until Oriana's departure from the P&O fleet. Other modifications during the 2006 refit included the extension of the cricket themed 'Lord's Tavern', and refurbishment of the children's play areas. All her cabins were restyled to include one of four new colour schemes, new curtains, carpets, beds, linen and duvets. During a 2011 refit at Blohm and Voss shipyard, Oriana's stern was remodelled and she was also converted to serve an adults only market, with the children's play areas removed and replaced with additional passenger cabins.

During cruises in four consecutive years to 2014 the ship suffered outbreaks of norovirus; about 400 passengers were affected in 2012, earning the vessel the nickname of "the plague ship". In 2014 passengers, angry at not being told of the earlier outbreaks, took legal action against P&O Cruises.

In June 2018, P&O Cruises announced that Oriana would be leaving the fleet in August 2019. Oriana departed on her final cruise, to Norway, the North Cape and Northern Ireland, on 23 July 2019 and returned on 9 August.

2019–present: Piano Land
In August 2019, Oriana joined the newly-formed Chinese cruise line Astro Ocean, and was renamed Piano Land. The name was chosen in reference to the Chinese island of Gulangyu, which is associated with music and known as the 'Island of Music'. Piano Land departed Southampton on 16 August 2019 and arrived in Xiamen, China on 20 September. She was christened by Ni Chao, the Director of the Xiamen Municipal Committee and the Director of the Free Trade Commission, on 26 September.
Astro Ocean Cruises and the Piano Land made their debut in Shanghai on 8 November 2019 as the ship marked her maiden call in China’s leading cruise port.

References

Notes

Bibliography

External links 

Official website at P&O Cruises
 Oriana of 1995- Postcards
 Photos
 Oriana Video Tour
 Oriana leaving the building hall

Ships of P&O Cruises
Ships built in Papenburg
1994 ships
Passenger ships of Bermuda